Jean-Claude Sikorav (born 21 June 1957) is a French mathematician.  He is professor at  the École normale supérieure de Lyon. He is specialized in symplectic geometry.

Main contributions
Sikorav is known for his proof, joint with François Laudenbach, of the Arnold conjecture for Lagrangian intersections in cotangent bundles, as well as for introducing generating families in symplectic topology.

Selected publications
Sikorav is one of fifteen members of a group of mathematicians who published the book Uniformisation des surfaces de Riemann under the pseudonym of Henri Paul de Saint-Gervais.

He has written the survey
.
and research papers
.
.

Honors
Sikorav is a Knight of the Ordre des Palmes Académiques.

References

External links
 
 Home page at the École Normale Supérieure de Lyon

1957 births
École Normale Supérieure alumni
Living people
French mathematicians
Chevaliers of the Ordre des Palmes Académiques
Topologists
Lycée Louis-le-Grand alumni